Dryden Lake is a lake located by Dryden, New York. Fish species present in the lake include bluegill, yellow perch, pickerel, and pumpkinseed sunfish. There is access via state owned boat launch on West Lake Road, 1 mile south of Dryden. No motors are allowed on this lake.

References

Lakes of New York (state)
Lakes of Tompkins County, New York